Lærke Møller (born 14 January 1989) is a former Danish handball player, who last played for the club Team Esbjerg and for the Danish women's national handball team.

At the 2010 European Women's Handball Championship she reached the bronze final and placed fourth with the Danish team.

Achievements
Damehåndboldligaen:
Winner: 2011, 2013
Silver Medalist: 2009, 2014
Bronze Medalist: 2006, 2007, 2012
DHF Landspokalturneringen:
Winner: 2012
EHF Champions League:
Semifinalist: 2006
EHF Cup:
Winner: 2011
Semifinalist: 2013

References

1989 births
Living people
Sportspeople from Aalborg
Danish female handball players